Route 100, also named Manchester Road through St. Louis County and Manchester Avenue and Chouteau Avenue through St. Louis City, is a state highway in the U.S. state of Missouri. It runs from Linn, Missouri at U.S. Route 50 to Interstate 55 in St. Louis.

Route description
Route 100 begins at US 50 in Linn. The highway heads north from Linn until it encounters the Missouri River, where it turns eastward to parallel the river. At Chamois, Missouri, it serves as the northern terminus of Route 89. It then enters Gasconade County near Morrison and bridges the Gasconade River near its mouth at the eponymous town. In the county seat, Hermann, Route 100 has a short concurrency with Route 19. The highway passes through New Haven, in Franklin County,   later. The highway then intersects Route 185 at its northern terminus, and Route 47 in Washington. It becomes an expressway outside the city limits, which runs to near Gray Summit. Route 100 crosses over Interstate 44 two times, with an interchange providing access to the freeway.

Northeast of Gray Summit, Route 100 crosses into St. Louis County, entering the city limits of Wildwood at the same time. Just north of the intersection with Route T, the highway becomes an expressway again. In Wildwood, it has an interchange with Route 109. Route 100 then enters Ellisville, where the expressway ends. From here all the way into St. Louis, the highway also carries the local name Manchester Road. In Ellisville, Route 340 (Clarkson Road) meets its southern terminus. Route 100 then proceeds into Ballwin. It then divides Manchester from Winchester, Missouri before wholly entering Manchester, where it has a single-point urban interchange (SPUI) with Route 141. Route 100 then runs through a swath of unincorporated territory en route to Des Peres. The route crosses over Interstate 270, the St. Louis beltway, in that town. East of Ellisville, Route 100 enters Kirkwood; there, Manchester Road intersects Kirkwood Road (the name given to Lindbergh Boulevard in Kirkwood), which carries US 61/67. Route 100 then passes through the smaller suburbs of Warson Woods, Glendale, Rock Hill, Brentwood, and Maplewood.

After leaving Maplewood, Route 100 continues into the independent City of St. Louis where the name changes from "Manchester Road" to "Manchester Avenue." As Manchester Avenue crosses Vandeventer Avenue, the highway becomes Chouteau Avenue. Route 100 continues east on Chouteau Avenue towards Downtown St. Louis. The route ends just east of South Broadway, at the Interstate 55 overpass. Due to the nearby east terminus of I-44, there is no interchange with I-55 at the state route's terminus.

The Lewis and Clark Trail
Most of Route 100 is part of the Lewis and Clark Trail. From Kirkwood Rd in Kirkwood to three miles (5 km) west of Wildwood is one section, where the trail turns off on Route T. Route T will eventually end, once again, at Route 100 northwest of I-44 and continue down Route 100 all the way to five miles (8 km) north of Linn (where Route 100 ends), and the Lewis and Clark Trail turns off onto Route C.

History

Much of the road between St. Louis and Gray Summit was the original U.S. Route 66, though this was only temporary until US 66 moved to its later location at what is now Watson Rd (Route 366) and Interstate 44. During, and after US 66 was moved off Manchester Rd, the road remained part of U.S. Route 50 for many years.

Major intersections

References

100
100
Streets in St. Louis
U.S. Route 50
Transportation in Osage County, Missouri
Transportation in Gasconade County, Missouri
Transportation in Franklin County, Missouri
Transportation in St. Louis County, Missouri